Nam Yoo-sun (also Nam Yu-seon, ; born July 23, 1985) is a South Korean swimmer, who specialized in individual medley events. She is a three-time Olympian (2000, 2004, and 2008), a fourth-place finalist at the 2002 Asian Games in Busan, and a two-time medalist in the individual medley (both 200 and 400 m) at the 2005 East Asian Games in Macau, China. Nam became the first South Korean swimmer in history to reach an Olympic final, until Park Tae-Hwan won the nation's first ever swimming medal at the succeeding Olympics in 2008.

Nam made her first South Korean team, as a 15-year-old, at the 2000 Summer Olympics in Sydney, where she competed in the women's 200 m individual medley. Swimming in heat two, she raced to fourth place and twenty-seventh overall by nearly five seconds behind winner Hana Černá of the Czech Republic in 2:22.53.

At the 2004 Summer Olympics in Athens, Nam placed seventh in the 400 m individual medley with a time of 4:50.35, edging out Greece's Vasiliki Angelopoulou by exactly half a second (0.50).

Eight years after her Olympic debut, Nam qualified for her third South Korean team, as a 23-year-old, at the 2008 Summer Olympics in Beijing. She eclipsed a FINA B-standard entry time of 4:52.38 from the Dong-A Swimming Championships in Ulsan. In the 400 m individual medley, she topped the first heat by five seconds ahead of Singapore's Quah Ting Wen with a time of 4:46.74. Nam failed to reach the top 8 final, as she placed twenty-eighth overall in the prelims.

References

External links
 
  (2000, 2004, 2008, 2016)
  (2000, 2004, 2008)

1985 births
Living people
South Korean female medley swimmers
Olympic swimmers of South Korea
Female medley swimmers
Swimmers from Seoul
Swimmers at the 2000 Summer Olympics
Swimmers at the 2004 Summer Olympics
Swimmers at the 2008 Summer Olympics
Swimmers at the 2016 Summer Olympics
Swimmers at the 2002 Asian Games
Swimmers at the 2006 Asian Games
Swimmers at the 2010 Asian Games
Swimmers at the 2014 Asian Games
Asian Games competitors for South Korea
20th-century South Korean women
21st-century South Korean women